The South Carolina Gamecocks men's track and field team represents the University of South Carolina and competes in the Southeastern Conference.  The team has been coached by Curtis Frye since 1997.  The facilities continue to be improved, including the recent addition of 1,450 seats at outdoor track & field facility.

Gamecocks in the Olympics
 Leroy Dixon (2008, United States, 4 × 100 Metres Relay)
 Adrian Durant (2004; Virgin Islands; 100 Metres, 200 Metres, & 4 × 100 Metres Relay)
 Otis Harris (2004, United States; 400 Metres, Silver Medal; 4 × 400 Metres Relay, Gold Medal)
 Rodney Martin (2008, United States, 4 × 100 Metres Relay)
 Jason Richardson (2012, United States, 110 Metres Hurdles, Silver Medal)
 Brad Snyder (1996, 2000, & 2004; Canada; Shot Put)
 Terrence Trammell (2000, 2004, & 2008; United States; 110 Metres Hurdles; 2000 & 2004 Silver Medals)
 Marvin Watts (2000, Jamaica, 800 Metres)

Year-by-Year Results

References

External links
South Carolina Gamecock Athletics